Cladonia turgida or the crazy-scale cup lichen is a species of cup lichen in the family Cladoniaceae.

Cladonia turgida contains atranorin and fumarprotocetraric acid with the latter compound sometimes in low quantities.

References

turgida
Lichen species
Lichens described in 1796
Taxa named by Georg Franz Hoffmann